The Olympic Regional Development Authority (ORDA) is a New York State public benefit corporation, created by the State of New York to manage the facilities used after the 1980 Olympic Winter Games at Lake Placid, New York.

ORDA is the only state-owned ski area organization in the United States. Destinations they operate include Whiteface Mountain, Gore Mountain, and Belleayre Mountain. ORDA operates the Olympic Center which houses ice skating, museum, event space, and offices for ORDA. It also operates the Olympic Sports Complex and Mount Van Hoevenberg located five miles from Lake Placid and the Olympic Ski Jumping Complex.

History
 On July 1, 1981, the New York State legislature (Article 8, Title 28, NYS Public Authorities Law) declared ORDA to maintain and operate all the Olympic sites of Lake Placid after the final 1980 winter Olympics.

In 1984 ORDA acquired Gore Mountain and added it to its portfolio.

In November 2011 Belleayre was transferred from the New York Department of Environmental Conservation to ORDA.

Organization
 ORDA's consists of its President and CEO Michael Pratt along with 12 board of directors, they are:

 Kelly Cummings, Board Chair
 Bill Beaney
 Cliff Donaldson
 Eric Gertler (Designee - Steve Hunt)
 Thomas Keegan
 Andy Lack
 Art Lussi
 Betty Little
 Diane Munro
 Erik Kulleseid (Designee - Chris Pushkarsh)
 Basil Seggos (Designee - Jeff Stefanko)
 Elinor Tatum

See also
 Adirondack Park Agency
 Agriculture & New York State Horse Breeding Development Fund
 Development Authority of the North Country
 Hudson River–Black River Regulating District
 New York Racing Association
 New York State Thoroughbred Breeding and Development Fund Corporation
 New York Wine/Grape Foundation
 Ogdensburg Bridge and Port Authority
 United Nations Development Corporation

References

External links

Public benefit corporations in New York (state)
Sports venues in New York (state)